Paludirex (meaning "swamp king") is an extinct genus of mekosuchine crocodylians from the Pliocene and Pleistocene of Australia. Remains of this animal have been found in the Riversleigh lagerstätte of northwestern Queensland. It was a medium-sized crocodile, estimated to grow to at least 4 metres in length.

Discovery and naming
In 1886 Charles Walter De Vis informally described Pallimnarchus pollens based on fragmentary cranomandibular and osteoderm material discovered around 1860 that was mineralised by apatite. While this marked the first fossil crocodile ever described from Australia, the name was merely coined "out of convenience". Regardless the name came to widespread use with a variety of specimens being referred in addition to the syntype specimens. In 1997 a second species was named by Paul Willis and Ralph Molnar, Pallimnarchus gracilis.

Given the fragmentary remains of the material the genus was based on, consisting of eight different pieces most likely belonging to multiple specimens and even taxa, a lectotype was established by Molnar in 1982. This lectotype, the anterior portion of a mandible (specimen QMF1149) was chosen as it was significantly more complete than the material the genus was previously based on. The mandible most likely belonged to an immature specimen, possibly 3 meters in length. Molnar's description was based on comparing Pallimnarchus to only 4 other species of crocodilians. The Saltwater Crocodile, Freshwater Crocodile, New Guinea Crocodile and Quinkana. While this was reasonable at the time, many more genera of crocodilians have been described from Australia since then, rendering the proportional differences between it and members of the genus Crocodylus and Quinkana insufficient. Furthermore, the specimen was lost some time during the 1990s to late 2000s, with only a small piece of the right mandible being rediscovered in 2004. Neither the rediscovered remains, description or illustrations of the lectotype were able to provide definitive autapomorphies. The non-diagnostic nature of both syntype and lectotype have left the genus Pallimnarchus in taxonomic limbo.

In 2020 Ristevski et al. revised the genus Pallimnarchus, declaring it dubious and instead coining the name Paludirex as a new taxon to include specimens previously included under Pallimnarchus pollens and Pallimnarchus gracilis. The holotype (specimens CMC2019-010 + QMF59017) is a fragmented, but well preserved skull discovered by Geoff Vincent between 1984 and 1990 near the Chinchilla Riffle Range in Darling Downs, known as the "Dalby Specimen" or simply as "Geoff Vincent's Specimen". Although the area preserves both Pliocene and Pleistocene sediments, direct correspondence with Vincent revealed that it had been found close to Pliocene strata. The skull was on display in Queensland before being returned to Darling Downs in 2011 to be put on display in the Chinchilla Museum. During the transfer the basicranium remained in Queensland before being identified as part of the Geoff Vincent's Specimen in 2018.

Further specimens of Paludirex vincenti include a left premaxilla and maxilla of uncertain age found near the Condamine River near Warra and the "Mirani Shire Skull", a specimen first referred to P. gracilis. This specimen is encased in concrete with only the bottom of the skull being visible, which obscures the true depth of the skull. However Ristevski et al. tentatively refer it to P. vincenti. Finally specimens QMF17065 and QMF17066 represent a complete premaxilla and associated anterior dentary found in the Pleistocene deposits of the Terrace Site Local Fauna in Riversleigh. QMF17065 serves as the holotype for the new combination Paludirex gracilis.

Paludirex is derived from the Latin words "paludis" and "rex", translating to "Swamp King". The name was chosen as it roughly preserves the original meaning of Pallimnarchus ("Ruler of all Swamps"). The specific name honors the late Geoff Vincent, who found the skull that served as the holotype.

Description
Paludirex was a large bodied mekosuchine crocodilian reaching lengths of at least 4 meters at maturity. It had a broad snout with a maximum width of around 50% of the total skull length at its widest point. Paludirex is characterised by a unique combination of various premaxillary features. This includes a distinctive arching of the anterior alveolar process of the premaxilla, a laterally shallowly sloping profile of the premaxilla, a peculiar arrangement of the first two premaxillary tooth and a noticeable size difference between the 3rd and 4th premaxillary tooth.

The external nares of Paludirex are approximately circular in shape and almost entirely encased by the premaxilla, with only a small section at the posterior margin being composed of the nasal. How far the nasal would have extended into the nares is unclear as the anterior-most tip is broken off. Both premaxilla are relatively well preserved, however it is difficult to make out their texture and subsequently determine how heavily ornamented they were. Based on what is observable and comparison with the other bones of the skull, the ornamentation consisted of a groove and ridge like pattern. The premaxilla is wider than long, indicating that Paludirex was brevirostrine (blunt snouted) and furthermore platyrostral (flat snouted, as opposed to the contemporary Quinkana). The transition from premaxilla to maxilla is marked by deep lateral notches on each side which accommodate the large dentary teeth when the jaws are closed. This gives the skull a constricted appearance when viewed from above. The maxilla are broken and the nasal is preserved in two parts, one anterior portion connected to the premaxilla and a posterior portion connected to the anterior frontal process. The lacrimals are longer than they are wide and relatively thick while of the prefrontals only a fragment from the left side is preserved. The frontal is well preserved, but split into two parts, one connected to the posterior end of the nasal and one connected to the remaining bones of the skull table. Where the narrow anterior process of the frontal meets the nasal, the suture between the bones is approximately trident-shaped, each "prong" being on roughly the same level. The space between the orbits is relatively whide and the orbital margins are rugose. The frontal preserves no sagittal crest. The postorbital are best preserved on the left side, making up a quarter of the margin of the relatively small, D-shaped supratemporal fenestra. The dorsal surface of the parietal makes up much of the medial skull table. The squamosal are incomplete and only preserve the anterior and medial portions of the bone.

Dentition
The first two premaxillary are distinct in Paludirex as they are on the same transverse plane, neither is more posterior or anterior than the other. There is a noticeable gap between the two that is larger than between the following teeth of the premaxilla. Another autapomorphy is the enlarged 4th premaxillary alveola, which is about twice the size of that of the 3rd premaxillary tooth. Each premaxilla preserves five teeth, witch 14 more teeth on each maxilla (based on the Mirani Shire Skull). All alveoli are circular in shape without any labiolingual compression, which clearly sets it apart from the ziphodont Quinkana.

Paludirex gracilis
The known remains of P. gracilis stem from Pleistocene deposits in north-western Queensland. The premaxilla are dorsoventrally much shallower and less robust than in P. vincenti and the 4th premaxillary alveola is 1.5 times larger in circumference than the 3rd. The differences in proportions between P. gracilis and P. vincenti do not correspond with intraspecific differences in modern crocodilians.

Phylogeny
Paludirex is a member of the Mekosuchinae, a family of crocodilians native to Oceania and the dominant Australian crocodilians throughout most of the Cenozoic. A strict consensus tree under implied weighting of characters following the study by Ristevski et al. can be seen below:

Paleobiology

Based on the cranial remains, Paludirex would have most likely been a large bodied semi-aquatic ambush predator. The skull shape is similar to that of extant crocodilians with a more generalist diet, suggesting that Paludirex could have been able to attack and subdue even large prey items. In their 2020 revision of the genus, Ristevski et al. propose that Paludirex may not have been the only large broad-snouted crocodilian of Pliocene Queensland. Specimen QMF1154 represents a non-ziphodont crocodile similar in size to Paludirex gracilis, however with a more robust skull and differing furthermore through different arrangement of the premaxillary teeth. The presence of another large bodied non-ziphodont crocodilian in the Chinchilla Sand would be of great importance to understanding the reptilian fauna of Pliocene Australia. Regardless, species of Paludirex would have been among the top predators of Pliocene to Pleistocene Australia up to their extinction, most likely caused due to environmental deterioration caused by the climatic changes that occurred towards the end of the Pleistocene.

References

Mekosuchinae
Prehistoric pseudosuchian genera
Pliocene crocodylomorphs
Pleistocene crocodylomorphs
Pleistocene genus extinctions
Riversleigh fauna
Fossil taxa described in 2020
Crocodiles of Australia